Latonia Blackman (born 6 October 1982) is a Barbadian netball player who represents Barbados internationally and plays in the positions of goal attack, goal shooter and goal defense. She competed at the Netball World Cup on five occasions in 1999, 2003, 2011, 2015 and 2019. She also represented Barbados at the Commonwealth Games in 1998, 2002, 2006, 2010, 2014 and in 2018.

References 

1982 births
Living people
Barbadian netball players
Netball players at the 1998 Commonwealth Games

Netball players at the 2002 Commonwealth Games

Netball players at the 2006 Commonwealth Games
Netball players at the 2010 Commonwealth Games
Netball players at the 2014 Commonwealth Games
Netball players at the 2018 Commonwealth Games
Commonwealth Games competitors for Barbados
2019 Netball World Cup players
Sportspeople from Bridgetown